Černčice is a municipality and village in Louny District in the Ústí nad Labem Region of the Czech Republic. It has about 1,300 inhabitants.

Notable people
Jana Moravcová (1937–2018), writer

References

Villages in Louny District